Tork Mahalleh (also Romanized as Tork Maḩalleh; also known as Turk Mahalleh) is a village in Esbu Kola Rural District, in the Central District of Babol County, Mazandaran Province, Iran. As of the 2006 census, its population was 1,638, in 413 families.

References 

Populated places in Babol County